Captain Saint Cyprian Churchill Tayler  MC (26 February 1896 – 17 March 1918) was an English World War I flying ace credited with nine aerial victories. He scored those victories while flying for two different squadrons, using three types of aircraft.

Early life
Saint Cyprian Churchill Tayler was born in Winchester, England, on 26 February 1896 to John Frederic Jenner and Minnie Ruth Tayler. By the time of his death his widowed mother was living at "The Haven" on Boshoffs Road, Natal, South Africa.

World War I
Tayler attended the Royal Military College, Sandhurst as a cadet, before being commissioned as a second lieutenant in the Royal Sussex Regiment on 16 August 1916. He was soon seconded to the Royal Flying Corps, and after completing his flying training he was appointed a flying officer on 6 February 1917.

Posted to No. 32 Squadron, he scored his first aerial victory on 14 May 1917 while flying an Airco DH.2 single-seat fighter in Arthur Coningham's flight. His squadron was re-equipped with the Airco DH.5, in which he scored twice more in early July, before he was appointed a flight commander on 13 July 1917, with the acting rank of captain. He shared in three more victories before a report of his being wounded in action on 31 July was published on 16 August 1917.

Tayler's exploits earned him the Military Cross, awarded on 26 September 1917. The award was gazetted on 9 January 1918, his citation reading:
Second Lieutenant St. Cyprian Churchill Tayler, Royal Sussex Regiment and Royal Flying Corps.
"For conspicuous gallantry and devotion to duty in leading offensive patrols against enemy aircraft. On five occasions at least he and his patrol have attacked and brought down hostile machines. These successes were almost entirely due to his very skilful piloting."

In late 1917 Tayler was posted to the newly formed No. 80 Squadron, to fly the Sopwith Camel single-seat fighter. He returned to combat in France with them in January 1918, serving as commander of "C" Flight. He was promoted to lieutenant on 16 February 1918. Tayler gained his last three victories on 10 and 11 March.

On 17 March 1918 he was shot down and killed in combat by Heinrich Kroll of Jasta 24. Originally reported as missing, his death was not officially confirmed until 12 November 1919. Having no known grave he is commemorated at the Arras Flying Services Memorial.

List of aerial victories

References
Notes

Bibliography
 

1896 births
1918 deaths
Military personnel from Winchester
Graduates of the Royal Military College, Sandhurst
Royal Sussex Regiment officers
Royal Flying Corps officers
British World War I flying aces
British military personnel killed in World War I
Aviators killed by being shot down
Recipients of the Military Cross